Omiostola is a genus of moths belonging to the subfamily Olethreutinae of the family Tortricidae.

Species
Omiostola adamantea Meyrick, 1922
Omiostola albidobrunnea Razowski & Wojtusiak, 2010
Omiostola alphitopa Meyrick, 1922
Omiostola basiramula Razowski & Wojtusiak, 2011
Omiostola brunneochroma Razowski & Wojtusiak, 2008
Omiostola delta Razowski & Wojtusiak, 2008
Omiostola detodesma Razowski & Wojtusiak, 2011
Omiostola gerda (Busck, 1911)
Omiostola hemeropis (Dognin, 1912)
Omiostola melanaspis (Meyrick, 1927)
Omiostola paradelta Razowski & Wojtusiak, 2010
Omiostola splendissima Razowski & Wojtusiak, 2008
Omiostola triangulifera Razowski & Wojtusiak, 2008
Omiostola varablancana (Razowski & Brown, 2010)
Omiostola youngi Razowski, 1999

See also
List of Tortricidae genera

References

 , 1922, Exotic Microlepid. 2: 519.
 ,2005 World Catalogue of Insects, 5
 , 2006, Monographs on Australian Lepidoptera Volume 10
 , 2010: Tortricidae (Lepidoptera) from Peru. Acta Zoologica Cracoviensia 53B (1-2): 73-159. . Full article: .
 , 2011: Tortricidae (Lepidoptera) from Colombia. Acta Zoologica Cracoviensia 54B (1-2): 103–128. Full article: .

External links
tortricidae.com

Olethreutini
Tortricidae genera
Taxa named by Edward Meyrick